All Together (also known as Walt Disney's All Together) is a 1942 three-minute educational short animated film made by the Walt Disney Studios, for the National Film Board of Canada. The film was released theatrically on January 13, 1942 as part of a series of four films directed at the Canadian public to buy war bonds during the Second World War.

All Together was directed by Jack King, and among other voice artists, featured the voice talent of Pinto Colvig as "Doc", Clarence "Ducky" Nash as "Donald Duck", and Walt Disney as "Mickey Mouse". This film marks the only appearance of Mickey Mouse in a World War II propaganda film. Additionally, Mickey appears in his Older "Dot Eyes" design in this short due to Animation being reused from older shorts. 

All Together features the characters from many of Disney's landmark animated features, including Snow White and the Seven Dwarfs (1937). Much of the short consists of reused work from The Band Concert (1935) and Mickey's Amateurs (1937).

Plot
In 1942, Mickey Mouse, conducting his band on a moving bandwagon, leads a parade marching through the streets of Ottawa, past the Canadian Parliament Buildings. In order, Pinocchio, Geppetto, Figaro, Donald Duck, Huey, Dewey, and Louie Duck, and Pluto carry banners with messages such as "All together for war savings" and "5 for 4."

Mickey Mouse motors by in a motorized float, conducting a band which includes Horace Horsecollar, Clarabelle Cow and Goofy, who plays the tuba and clarinet and a concertina, between his knees. The Seven Dwarfs follow with signs indicating, "All-Together-For-War-Savings" but with Dopey typically doing things in a clumsy, confused way, for slapstick effect. Overhead and in other scenes, war machines punctuate the message to "Keep your money fighting till victory is won".

Cast
Disney characters: 

 Mickey Mouse
 Donald Duck
 Goofy
 Pluto
 Huey, Dewey and Louie
 Horace Horsecollar
 Clarabelle Cow
 Pinocchio
 Geppetto
 Figaro
 Doc
 Grumpy
 Happy
 Bashful
 Sleepy
 Sneezy
 Dopey

Production  
In 1939, with the outbreak of a global war, Walt Disney Studios felt a great pinch in their finances due to the loss of much of their European markets. This was further limited with the invasion of France by Nazi forces in 1940, which meant that the next Disney release Pinocchio (1940) was only dubbed in Spanish and Portuguese, a great deal less languages than previous Disney works.

Due to this loss of profit, and losses on recent films, Disney studios faced a bleak outlook of a deficit of over half a million dollars, layoffs and pay cuts for the first time in the studio, and a $2.23 million ceiling on their credit allowance. With bleak prospects, the studio was made into a corporation in April 1940, which raised $3.6 million to help pay off debts owed by the studio. To enable his studios to keep afloat and producing films, Walt Disney sought out external funding to cover production costs, which would allow him to keep employees on the payroll and keep the studio working.

On March 3, 1941, Disney invited over three dozen different representatives of various national defence industries to a lunch meeting, in an attempt to solicit work from them. He followed this luncheon with formal letters offering work "For national defence industries at cost, and without profit. In making this offer, I am motivated solely by a desire to help as best I can in the present emergency." Four Methods of Flush Riveting (1941) was first training film that was commissioned by Lockheed Aircraft.

In response to Disney's efforts, John Grierson, the head of the National Film Board of Canada entered into a co-production agreement for four animated films to promote the Canadian War Savings Plan. The films, in order of production, were: The Thrifty Pig (1941), 7 Wise Dwarfs (1941), Donald's Decision (1942) and All Together (1942), In addition, a training film for the Canadian Army, that eventually became Stop That Tank! (1942) was commissioned.

Reception
While intended for a theatrical audience, All Together along with the other three films in the series, was effective in delivering its message to Canadians through their local War Savings Committee. When the United States entered the war, these shorts were later released as part of the eight bond drives in the United States.

Television
All Together was shown on "Episode 56: Wartime Disney', part of The Ink and Paint Club (1997).

Home media
The short was released on May 18, 2004 on Walt Disney Treasures: Walt Disney on the Front Lines.

See also
 List of World War II short films
 Walt Disney's World War II propaganda production

References

Notes

Citations

Bibliography

 Barrier, Michael. Hollywood Cartoons: American Animation in its Golden Age. New York: Oxford University Press, 2003. .
 Cheu, Johnson. (Ed.). Diversity in Disney Films: Critical Essays on Race, Ethnicity, Gender, Sexuality and Disability. Jefferson, North Carolina: McFarland & Company, 2013. .
 Gabler, Neal. Walt Disney: The Triumph of the American Imagination. New York: Vintage, 2007. .
 Maltin, Leonard. The Disney Films (4th Edition). New York: JessieFilms Ltd., 2000. .
 Shull, Michael S. and David E. Wilt. Doing Their Bit: Wartime American Animated Short Films, 1939-1945 (2nd ed.) Jefferson, North Carolina: McFarland & Company, Incorporated Publishers, 2004. .
 Telotte, J. P. Animating Space: From Mickey to WALL-E. United States: The University Press of Kentucky, 2010. . 
 Van Riper, Bowdoin A. Learning from Mickey, Donald and Walt: Essays on Disney's Edutainment films. Jefferson, North Carolina: McFarland & Company, 2011. .

External links
 

1942 films
1942 animated films
1940s Disney animated short films
Films directed by Jack King
Films produced by Walt Disney
Films set in Ontario
Snow White (franchise)
National Film Board of Canada animated short films
Canadian World War II propaganda films
Canadian animated short films
Quebec films
Seven Dwarfs
Films about dwarfs
1940s Canadian films